In enzymology, a coproporphyrinogen dehydrogenase is an enzyme that catalyzes the chemical reaction

coproporphyrinogen III + 2 S-adenosyl-L-methionine  protoporphyrinogen IX + 2 CO2 + 2 L-methionine + 2 5'-deoxyadenosine

Thus, the two substrates of this enzyme are coproporphyrinogen III and S-adenosyl-L-methionine, whereas its 4 products are protoporphyrinogen IX, CO2, L-methionine, and 5'-deoxyadenosine.

This enzyme belongs to the family of oxidoreductases, specifically those acting on the CH-CH group of donor with other acceptors.  The systematic name of this enzyme class is coproporphyrinogen-III:S-adenosyl-L-methionine oxidoreductase (decarboxylating). Other names in common use include oxygen-independent coproporphyrinogen-III oxidase, HemF, HemN, radical SAM enzyme, and coproporphyrinogen III oxidase.  This enzyme participates in porphyrin and chlorophyll metabolism. HemN is the Oxygen-independent oxidase produced in E. coli.  HemF is the oxygen-dependent oxidase within E. coli. Importantly, only HemN utilizes S-adenosyl Methionine (SAM). Human variants of Coproporphyrinogen oxidase are cofactor-independent.

References

 
 

EC 1.3.99
Enzymes of unknown structure